Tim Hesterberg is an American Statistician. He is a Fellow of the American Statistical Association and currently works as a Staff Data Scientist at Instacart.

Education and career
Tim Hesterberg graduated with a B.A in mathematics from St. Olaf College and received his Ph.D. in statistics from Stanford University. Hesterberg is a member of the National Institute of Statistical Sciences(NISS) and was previously on the NISS Board of Trustees. He is currently on the board of the Canadian Statistical Sciences Institute. He previously worked as a Senior Statistician at Google as well as at Franklin and Marshall College, Pacific Gas & Electric Co, and Insightful/MathSoft. Hesterberg currently is a Senior Statistician at Instacart.

Research 
Tim Hesterberg contributed to statistical research by authoring a textbook, several articles, and a software package. These are:

 A 2011 undergraduate student textbook titled Mathematical Statistics with Resampling and R. 

 A 2015 article titled "What Teachers Should Know About the Bootstrap: Resampling in the Undergraduate Statistics Curriculum". 

 A 2015 R (programming language) software package titled `resample: Resampling Functions`. This package is intended to be easy to use. It performs bootstraps, permutation tests, and other sampling refunctions.

 Several scientific articles including Bootstrap, Least-Angle Regression and LASSO for Large Datasets, and Least Angle and L1 Penalized Regression: A Review.

References 

Year of birth missing (living people)
Living people
Wikipedia Student Program
American statisticians
St. Olaf College alumni
Stanford University alumni
Fellows of the American Statistical Association